The 2021 North Carolina A&T Aggies football team represented the North Carolina A&T State University during the 2021 NCAA Division I FCS football season. The Aggies played their home games at the Truist Stadium in Greensboro, North Carolina. The team was coached by fourth-year head coach Sam Washington.  This was the first season for the Aggies joining the Big South Conference.

Schedule 
North Carolina A&T announced its 2021 football schedule on April 21, 2021. The 2021 schedule consisted of 5 home and 6 away games in the regular season.

References

North Carolina AandT
North Carolina A&T Aggies football seasons
North Carolina AandT Aggies football